Cédric Elysée Kodjo is an Ivorian professional footballer who plays as a forward.

References

External links

Living people
1993 births
Ivorian footballers
Association football midfielders
Fath Union Sport players
Ivory Coast international footballers